The following is a list of notable deaths in April 2018.

Entries for each day are listed alphabetically by surname. A typical entry lists information in the following sequence:
 Name, age, country of citizenship at birth, subsequent country of citizenship (if applicable), reason for notability, cause of death (if known), and reference.

April 2018

1
Amsale Aberra, 64, Ethiopian-born American fashion designer, uterine cancer.
Françoise Adret, 97, French ballerina and choreographer.
Bob Beattie, 85, American skiing coach (national team) and sports commentator (ABC Sports, ESPN).
Steven Bochco, 74, American television producer and writer (Hill Street Blues, L.A. Law, NYPD Blue), 10-time Emmy winner, leukemia.
Gil Brealey, 85, Australian film director and producer (Sunday Too Far Away, Annie's Coming Out).
Ricardo Pedro Chaves Pinto Filho, 79, Brazilian Roman Catholic prelate, Bishop of Leopoldina (1990–1996) and Archbishop of Pouso Alegre (1996–2014).
Foster Diebold, 85, American academic, President of the University of Alaska system (1977–1979) and Edinboro University of Pennsylvania (1979–1996).
Edward Digby, 12th Baron Digby, 93, British peer and Army officer.
Gabriel Dover, 80, British geneticist, chest infection.
Robert F. Gatje, 90, American architect, stroke.
Kazimierz Gierżod, 81, Polish pianist.
Almerindo Jaka Jamba, 69, Angolan politician and rebel leader (UNITA), stroke.
Etelka Keserű, 92, Hungarian politician, Minister of Light Industry (1971–1980).
Audrey Morris, 89, American jazz singer and pianist.
Brian Moynahan, 77, British journalist and historian.
Vladimir Nakoryakov, 82, Russian physicist, absorptive heat pump theorist.
Jocelyn Newman, 80, Australian politician, Senator for Tasmania (1986–2002), Minister for Social Security (1996–1998) and Family and Community Services (1998–2001), Alzheimer's disease.
Aimo Nieminen, 77, Finnish Olympic weightlifter.
John Pretlove, 85, English cricketer (Kent).
C. V. Rajendran, 81, Indian film director.
Efraín Ríos Montt, 91, Guatemalan military officer and politician, President (1982–1983), heart attack.
Avichai Rontzki, 66, Israeli general, Chief Military Rabbi of the Israel Defence Forces (2006–2010), colorectal cancer.
Michel Sénéchal, 91, French tenor.
Ruth Sonntag Nussenzweig, 89, Austrian-Brazilian immunologist.
Efraín Trelles, 64, Peruvian historian of Spanish colonialism and sports commentator, heart attack.
Julia Vargas-Weise, 76, Bolivian photographer, screenwriter, and film director (Sealed Cargo).

2
Susan Anspach, 75, American actress (Five Easy Pieces, Play It Again, Sam, Blume in Love), heart failure.
Clyde Billington Jr., 83, American politician, member of the Connecticut House of Representatives (1971–1979).
P. L. Thibaut Brian, 87, American chemical engineer.
Alton Ford, 36, American basketball player (Phoenix Suns, Houston Rockets), lymphoma.
Anthony Freeman, 29, American Roman Catholic religious brother and author, dilated cardiomyopathy.
Morris Halle, 94, Latvian-born American linguist.
Claus Heß, 84, German Olympic rower (1956).
Evert Kroon, 71, Dutch water polo player, Olympic bronze medalist (1976).
Tuiloma Pule Lameko, 83, Samoan politician.
Connie Lawn, 73, American journalist, longest-serving White House correspondent, Parkinson's disease.
Winnie Madikizela-Mandela, 81, South African anti-apartheid activist and politician, MP (since 2009), complications of diabetes.
Ahmed Janka Nabay, 54, Sierra Leonean Bubu musician.
Elie Onana, 66, Cameroonian footballer (Canon Yaoundé, national team).
Bill Rademacher, 75, American football player (New York Jets, New England Patriots, Northern Michigan Wildcats).
Laura Roslof, 69, American illustrator (Dungeons & Dragons).
Fufi Santori, 85, Puerto Rican Olympic basketball player (1960) and writer.
Paul Sinibaldi, 96, French footballer (Reims).
Burton Smith, 77, American computer scientist, complications from heart disease.
Ahmed Khaled Tawfik, 55, Egyptian novelist.
Wilbur Ternyik, 92, American civic leader and politician.
Minoru Uchida, 91, Japanese actor (Royal Space Force: The Wings of Honnêamise).
Bhai Vaidya, 89, Indian politician.
Velga Vīlipa, 78, Latvian actress.

3
Bujari Ahmed, 65, Sahrawi diplomat and independentism leader, Permanent Representative of Polisario to the UN (since 1992).
Ron Dunbar, 78, American songwriter ("Give Me Just a Little More Time", "Band of Gold", "Patches"), Grammy winner (1971).
David Edgerton, 90, American entrepreneur, co-founder of Burger King, complications from surgery.
David J. Foulis, 87, American mathematician.
Pam Golding, 89, South African real estate developer.
Eugene M. Grant, 99, American real estate mogul.
Mary Hatcher, 88, American actress (The Big Wheel), bile duct cancer.
Dale Haupt, 88, American football coach (Chicago Bears, Philadelphia Eagles).
Kelly Lai Chen, 84, Hong Kong actor.
Lill-Babs, 80, Swedish singer ("En tuff brud i lyxförpackning", "Är du kär i mej ännu Klas-Göran?") and actress, cancer and heart failure.
Hashem Mahameed, 73, Israeli politician, member of Knesset (1990–2003).
Stuart Matchett, 67, Australian broadcaster, cancer.
Charles McDew, 79, American civil rights activist.
Arrigo Petacco, 88, Italian journalist and writer.
Irma Rapuzzi, 107, French politician.
Jacques Tixier, 93, French archaeologist and prehistorian.
Tomas Villa, 34, Mexican boxer, traffic collision.

4
Ignatius Peter VIII Abdalahad, 87, Syrian Syriac Catholic hierarch, Patriarch of Antioch and all the East (2001–2008).
Andres Ammas, 56, Estonian politician.
David Bonetti, 71, American art critic.
Burt Boyar, 90, American voice actor (Archie Andrews) and author.
Don Cherry, 94, American singer ("Band of Gold") and golfer.
Elton Georges, 74, British Virgin Islands politician, Deputy Governor (1983–2003, 2007–2008).
Gertrude Jeannette, 103, American actress (Shaft).
Li Zhengyou, 82, Chinese agronomist and politician, Vice-Governor of Yunnan Province.
John Lynch, 91, British historian of Latin America.
C. Shannon Mallory, 81, American Anglican prelate, Bishop of Botswana (1972–1978) and El Camino Real (1980–1990), leukemia.
Jim Nielsen, 79, Canadian politician, MLA (1975–1986).
Soon-Tek Oh, 85, South Korean-American actor (The Man with the Golden Gun, Mulan, M*A*S*H), Alzheimer's disease.
Jonathan Pitre, 17, Canadian advocate for raising awareness of epidermolysis bullosa, complications from septic shock.
Stuart Pottasch, 86, American astronomer.
Raobail, 80, Indian cartoonist.
Joaquín del Real, 76, Spanish Olympic rower.
Leonid Sokov, 76, Russian artist and sculptor.
Johnny Valiant, 71, American Hall of Fame professional wrestler (The Valiant Brothers) and manager (WWF, AWA), traffic collision.
Clément Vincent, 86, Canadian politician, MP (1962–1966).
Ron White, 64, Canadian actor (Copper, Unforgiven, Republic of Doyle), cancer.
Ray Wilkins, 61, English football player (Chelsea, Manchester United) and manager (Queens Park Rangers), heart attack.

5
Yuriy Abramochkin, 81, Russian photographer and photojournalist.
Grady Alderman, 79, American football player (Minnesota Vikings).
Eric Bristow, 60, English Hall of Fame darts player, world champion (1980, 1981, 1984, 1985, 1986), heart attack.
George Bryanchaninov, 98, Russian-Australian priest in the Russian Greek Catholic Church.
Cynthia Chalk, 104, Canadian photographer.
Charles de Chassiron, 69, British diplomat, cancer.
Geoffrey M. Footner, 94, American maritime historian, heart failure.
Dieter Freise, 73, German field hockey player, Olympic champion (1972).
Lars Hall, 79, Swedish advertiser and art director.
Ajith Kollam, 55, Indian actor, stomach illness.
Tim O'Connor, 90, American actor (Peyton Place, General Hospital, Buck Rogers in the 25th Century), cancer.
Bolette Sutermeister Petri, 97, Danish-Swiss travel writer. (death announced on this date)
Branislav Pokrajac, 71, Serbian handball player, Olympic champion (1972).
Frederick D. Reese, 88, American civil rights activist.
Saw O Moo, 42–43, Burmese environmental activist, shot.
Mete Sozen, 87, Turkish-born American structural engineer.
Isao Takahata, 82, Japanese film director, producer and screenwriter (Grave of the Fireflies, Only Yesterday, The Tale of the Princess Kaguya), co-founder of Studio Ghibli, lung cancer.
Cecil Taylor, 89, American jazz pianist and poet.
Jaime Thorne León, 74, Peruvian politician, Minister of Defense (2010–2011).
Irina Tokmakova, 89, Russian writer.
Raymonde Vergauwen, 90, Belgian Olympic swimmer (1952).

6
Daniel Akaka, 93, American educator and politician, member of the U.S. House of Representatives from Hawaii's 2nd district (1977–1990) and Senate (1990–2013), organ failure.
Daniel Chavarría, 84, Uruguayan-born Cuban author.
Dorothy Garlock, 98, American historical romance author.
Billy Gustafsson, 70, Swedish politician, MP (2002–2014).
Jacques Higelin, 77, French pop singer.
Raj Kishore, 85, Indian actor (Sholay), heart attack.
Aleksandr Kurlovich, 56, Belarusian weightlifter, Olympic champion (1988, 1992).
Senteni Masango, 37, Swazi royal, 8th wife of Mswati III of Eswatini.
Donald McKayle, 87, American dancer and choreographer (The Great White Hope, Bedknobs and Broomsticks, The Jazz Singer).
Colin McLeod, 96, New Zealand civil engineer, Commissioner of Works (1973–1981).
Yaser Murtaja, 30, Palestinian journalist, shot.
Pavol Paška, 60, Slovak politician, MP (since 2002), Speaker of the Slovak National Council (2006–2010, 2012–2014).
Acácio Pereira Magro, 85, Portuguese politician, economist and academic, Minister of Social Affairs (1978–1979) and Commerce and Tourism (1979–1980).
Henryk Skolimowski, 87, Polish philosopher.
Lewis Van Bergen, 79, American actor (Bugsy, Sable).
Edla Van Steen, 81, Brazilian playwright, actress and journalist.
Urbano Zea, 49, Mexican Olympic swimmer (1988), heart attack.

7
Brigitte Ahrenholz, 65, German rower, Olympic champion (1976). (body discovered on this date)
Ai Xing, 93, Chinese mechanical engineer, member of the Chinese Academy of Engineering.
Agni Vlavianos Arvanitis, 82, American biologist.
Gerald Ayres, 82, American studio executive (Columbia Pictures) and film producer (The Last Detail, Cisco Pike), complications from dementia.
Munin Barua, 71, Indian film director.
John D. Biggers, 94–95, British biologist and physiologist.
Petr Braiko, 98, Soviet soldier, Hero of the Soviet Union.
Petr Černý, 84, Czechoslovak-born Canadian mineralogist.
Peter Grünberg, 78, German physicist, co-discoverer of giant magnetoresistance, Nobel Prize laureate (2007).
Gerd Honsik, 76, Austrian writer and Holocaust denier.
Li Zhen, 93, Chinese politician, Chairman of the Shandong People's Congress (1985–1996).
Samuel B. McKinney, 91, American civil rights activist and pastor.
Ángel Peralta Pineda, 92, Spanish rejoneador, respiratory failure.
Božidar Smiljanić, 81, Croatian actor.
Wang Wusheng, 73, Chinese photographer.

8
Leila Abashidze, 88, Georgian actress (Keto and Kote), film director and screenwriter, stroke.
Tate Adams, 96, Northern Irish-born Australian printmaker.
António Barros, 68, Portuguese footballer (Benfica, national team).
William Sperry Beinecke, 103, American philanthropist.
Nathan Davis, 81, American jazz musician.
Michael Goolaerts, 23, Belgian racing cyclist, heart attack.
Juraj Herz, 83, Czech film director, actor, writer and scenic designer.
Barbora Horáčková, 49, Czech Olympic archer (2008).
Efraín Jara Idrovo, 92, Ecuadorian writer and existentialist poet, Premio Eugenio Espejo (1999).
Viacheslav Koleichuk, 77, Russian sound artist.
Fjodor Koltšin, 61, Estonian Olympic skier (1980).
Sir Peter Le Cheminant, 97, British air chief marshal, Lieutenant Governor of Guernsey (1980–1985).
André Lerond, 87, French footballer (Lyon, Stade Français, national team).
Chuck McCann, 83, American voice actor (DuckTales, G.I. Joe: A Real American Hero, Fantastic Four), heart failure.
Joe McConnell, 79, American sports announcer (Minnesota Vikings, Indiana Pacers, Chicago White Sox).
John Miles, 74, British racing driver, complications from a stroke.
Gunnar Persson, 84, Swedish cartoonist.
Guy Lyon Playfair, 83, British author and paranormal researcher.
Óscar Saavedra San Martín, 77, Bolivian physicist, astrophysicist and academic.

9
Fredy Brupbacher, 83, Swiss Olympic alpine skier.
Felix Chen, 75, Taiwanese conductor.
Pierre Descoteaux, 66, Canadian lawyer and politician.
Liam Devally, 85, Irish singer, television presenter and lawyer.
Barney A. Ebsworth, 83, American business executive (Build-A-Bear Workshop) and art collector.
Jonathan M. Hess, 52, American philologist, aneurysm.
Jigjidiin Mönkhbat, 76, Mongolian wrestler, Olympic silver medalist (1968).
Ira Philip, 92, Bermudian writer and politician.
Silviniaco Conti, 12, French racehorse, team chasing accident.
Kimberly G. Smith, 69, American biologist.
Felipe Tejeda García, 83, Mexican Roman Catholic prelate, Auxiliary Bishop of México (2000–2010).

10
Alex Beckett, 35, English actor (Twenty Twelve, W1A, I Live with Models), suicide by hanging.
Danarto, 76, Indonesian writer and artist.
John Dlugos, 89, Canadian football player (Edmonton Eskimos).
F'Murr, 72, French comics artist (Le Génie des alpages).
Samir Gharbo, 93, Egyptian Olympic water polo player (1948, 1952).
Viliam Karmažin, 95, Slovak composer and conductor.
Andre de Krayewski, 84, Polish-American graphic artist.
John Lambie, 77, Scottish football player (Falkirk, St Johnstone) and manager (Partick Thistle).
Li Dawei, 47, Chinese director (The Story of a Noble Family), intrahepatic cholangiocarcinoma.
Li Yaowen, 99, Chinese admiral and diplomat, Political Commissar of the PLA Navy (1980–1990).
Jean Marzollo, 75, American children's author (I Spy).
J. D. McClatchy, 72, American poet, cancer.
Fergie McCormick, 78, New Zealand rugby union player (Canterbury, national team), throat cancer.
Richard Muth, 90, American economist, gallbladder cancer.
Alastair Rellie, 83, British intelligence officer.
Matthew Stark, 88, American civil rights activist.
Sauro Tomà, 92, Italian football player (Torino F.C.).
Wu Nansheng, 95, Chinese politician, party chief of Shenzhen.
Yang Gui, 89, Chinese politician, chief designer of the Red Flag Canal.

11
Gillian Ayres, 88, British abstract artist.
Jim Caine, 91, Manx jazz pianist and radio presenter.
Karen Dawisha, 68, American political scientist and writer (Putin's Kleptocracy), lung cancer.
Bruce M. Fischer, 82, American actor (Escape from Alcatraz, The Outlaw Josey Wales).
Jumana El Husseini, 86, Palestinian artist.
Li Tian, 79, Chinese physicist and aircraft designer.
Jorge Lozada Stanbury, 87, Peruvian agricultural engineer and politician, Member of the Congress (1963–1965), constituent deputy (1978–1980) and Speaker of the Senate (1988).
Robert Matthews, 56, British athlete, Paralympic champion (1984, 1988, 1992, 2000), brain tumor.
Patrick F. McManus, 84, American writer.
Mauro Panaggio, 90, American basketball coach (SUNY Brockport, Rochester Zeniths, Quad City Thunder).
Polixeni Papapetrou, 57, Australian photographer, breast cancer.
Phillip Pipersburg, 62, Belizean Olympic sprinter.
Theo Ramos, 89, Spanish-born British painter.
Jean-Claude Servan-Schreiber, 100, French politician and journalist, MP (1965–1967).
Mitzi Shore, 87, American comedy club owner (The Comedy Store), Parkinson's disease.
Zola Skweyiya, 75, South African politician, Minister of Public Service and Administration (1994–1999) and Social Development (1999–2009), High Commissioner to the UK (2009–2014).
Carmen Stănescu, 92, Romanian actress, cardiopulmonary arrest.
Alexander Welsh, 84, American literary scholar.
Kevin Wortman, 49, American ice hockey player (Calgary Flames, JYP Jyväskylä, Schwenninger Wild Wings).

12
Gyula Babos, 68, Hungarian jazz guitarist.
Heinrich Brändli, 79, Swiss engineer.
Giuliano Cenci, 86, Italian animated film director (The Adventures of Pinocchio), injuries due to a fall.
Naseem Mirza Changezi, 108, Indian independence activist.
Ronald Chesney, 97, British comedy screenwriter (On the Buses, The Rag Trade, Romany Jones).
Deborah Coleman, 61, American blues musician, complications from bronchitis and pneumonia.
Stuart Devlin, 86, Australian goldsmith.
Irwin Gage, 78, American pianist.
Carlos Enrique Gómez Centurión, 93, Argentine politician, geologist and diplomat, Governor of San Juan (1971–1973, 1987–1991).
Hu Chengzhi, 100, Chinese palaeontologist and palaeoanthropologist, discoverer of Keichousaurus.
Rafael Grossman, 84, American rabbi.
Brij Bhushan Kabra, 81, Indian classical slide guitar player (Call of the Valley).
Juozas Karvelis, 83, Lithuanian politician, co-signatory of the Act of the Re-Establishment.
Takeda Kiyoko, 100, Japanese scholar.
Zoran Krasić, 62, Serbian politician, Minister of Trade (1998–2000).
Alan Lloyd, 91, British writer and journalist.
Oliver Lozano, 77, Filipino lawyer and politician.
Nestor Mata, 92, Filipino journalist.
John Melcher, 93, American politician, member of the U.S. House of Representatives from Montana's 2nd district (1969–1977) and Senate (1977–1989).
Neil Nugent, 91, British field hockey player, Olympic bronze medalist (1952).
Len Okrie, 94, American baseball player and coach (Washington Senators, Boston Red Sox).
Bob Pickens, 75, American wrestler and football player (Chicago Bears).
Sergio Pitol, 85, Mexican novelist and translator, Miguel de Cervantes Prize (2005), aphasia.
Dame Daphne Sheldrick, 83, Kenyan-British conservationist, breast cancer.

13
Yogesh Atal, 80, Indian sociologist.
Art Bell, 72, American author (The Coming Global Superstorm) and radio host (Coast to Coast AM, Art Bell's Dark Matter), chronic obstructive pulmonary disease.
Zbigniew Bujarski, 84, Polish composer.
Cesarino Cervellati, 88, Italian football player and manager (Bologna).
Ron Cooper, 79, English footballer (Peterborough United).
Barrie Dexter, 96, Australian diplomat and public servant.
J. Harold Ellens, 84, American psychologist and theologian.
Walter Fink, 87, German entrepreneur and music patron.
Miloš Forman, 86, Czech-American film director (One Flew Over the Cuckoo's Nest, Amadeus, The People vs. Larry Flynt), Oscar winner (1976, 1985).
Joy Laville, 94, English-Mexican artist, National Prize for Arts and Sciences (2012).
André Maman, 90, French politician and Romance philologist, Senator (1992–2001).
William Nack, 77, American journalist (Newsday, Sports Illustrated) and author.
Tata Subba Rao, 75–76, Indian-born British statistician.
Lidia Redondo de Lucas, 52, Spanish librist and politician, Senator (2005–2008).
Marc Rowell, 80, Australian politician, member of the Queensland Legislative Assembly for Hinchinbrook (1989–2006).
Clive Stanbrook, 70, British barrister.
Fernando Tamayo Tamayo, 68, Colombian economist and politician, MP (1994–2010) and Senator (since 2010), cancer.
Gus Weill, 85, American political writer and strategist.

14
Rajendra Bhalekar, 66, Indian cricketer, multiple organ failure.
Isabella Biagini, 74, Italian actress (Love Italian Style, Il clan dei due Borsalini, The Future Is Woman), complications from a stroke.
Colin Bland, 80, South African cricketer (national team).
Frank Bren, 74, Australian actor and playwright. 
David Buckel, 60, American LGBT rights lawyer, suicide by fire.
Daedra Charles, 49, American basketball player (Los Angeles Sparks), Olympic bronze medalist (1992).
Hal Greer, 81, American Hall of Fame basketball player (Philadelphia 76ers), NBA champion (1967).
Sam Hamill, 74, American poet and publisher.
Michael D. Healy, 91, American military officer.
Robert Holmes, 72, American football player (Kansas City Chiefs, Houston Oilers).
Ram Kumar, 93, Indian artist.
Jean-Claude Malgoire, 77, French conductor.
Jon Michelet, 73, Norwegian author (Orion's Belt), cancer.
Gerald Nachman, 80, American journalist and author.
Roger G. Newton, 93, German-born American physicist.
Stan Reynolds, 92, British jazz musician.
Armando Salgado, 80, Mexican photographer and photojournalist (Corpus Christi massacre), pancreatic cancer.
Neil Shand, 84, British comedy writer (Q..., The Russ Abbot Show) and journalist (Daily Mail).
Kirk Simon, 63, American documentarian (Strangers No More, Chimps: So Like Us, Rehearsing a Dream), Oscar winner (2011), cardiac arrest.
André Sterling, 94, Belgian civil engineer.

15
Hadassa Ben-Itto, 91, Polish-born Israeli judge and writer.
Maksim Borodin, Russian journalist, complications after falling from his fifth-floor balcony.
Bob Braden, 84, American computer scientist.
Rinaldo Fidel Brédice, 85, Argentine Roman Catholic prelate, Bishop of Santa Rosa (1992–2008).
Philip D'Antoni, 89, American film producer (The French Connection, Bullitt, The Seven-Ups), Oscar winner (1972).
Frank Drowota, 79, American judge, Chief Justice of the Tennessee Supreme Court (1989–1990; 2000–2005).
R. Lee Ermey, 74, American actor (Full Metal Jacket, Toy Story, The Texas Chainsaw Massacre) and military drill instructor, complications from pneumonia.
Michael Halliday, 93, English-born Australian linguist.
Beatrix Hamburg, 94, American psychiatrist, Alzheimer's disease.
Luise Hercus, 92, German-born Australian linguist.
Judy Kennedy, 73, American politician, Mayor of Newburgh, New York (since 2012), ovarian cancer.
Kenneth Matiba, 85, Kenyan politician, MP (1972–1990, 1992–1997).
Boki Milošević, 86, Serbian clarinetist.
Miriam Naveira, 83, Puerto Rican jurist, first woman Associate Justice (1985–2003) and Chief Justice of the Supreme Court (2003–2004).
George Oster, 77, American biologist.
Domenico Pittella, 86, Italian politician, Senator (1972–1983), complications from a broken hip.
Edward Diego Reyes, 88, Guamanian politician, Lieutenant Governor of Guam (1983–1987).
Neena Schwartz, 91, American endocrinologist.
Waqar Ahmad Shah, 74, Indian politician, MLA (1993–2017).
Frank Skartados, 62, Greek-born American politician, member of the New York State Assembly (2009–2010, since 2012), pancreatic cancer.
Vittorio Taviani, 88, Italian film director (Padre Padrone, Kaos, Caesar Must Die).
Stefano Zappalà, 77, Italian politician, MEP (1999–2009), respiratory failure.
H. Dieter Zeh, 85, German theoretical physicist.

16
Harry Anderson, 65, American actor (Night Court, Dave's World, It) and magician, stroke.
Gustav Victor Rudolf Born, 96, German-born British pharmacologist.
Vic Bubas, 91, American college basketball coach (Duke Blue Devils).
Carlos Chasseing, 91, Argentine politician, De facto Federal Interventor of Córdoba (1976–1979).
Choi Eun-hee, 91, South Korean actress (The Lovers and the Despot).
Florea Dumitrescu, 91, Romanian politician and diplomat, Minister of Finance (1969–1978), Governor of the National Bank (1984–1989).
Sir Roger Elliott, 89, British theoretical physicist.
Beverley Farmer, 77, Australian novelist and short story writer.
Giant's Causeway, 21, American racehorse and sire.
Pamela Gidley, 52, American actress (The Pretender, Twin Peaks: Fire Walk with Me, CSI: Crime Scene Investigation) and model.
Earl B. Gustafson, 90, American judge and politician, member of the Minnesota House of Representatives (1963–1967, 1969–1971), dementia.
Ken Hottman, 69, American baseball player (Chicago White Sox).
Henri Landwirth, 91, Belgian hotelier and philanthropist, founder of Give Kids the World Village.
Dona Ivone Lara, 97, Brazilian singer and composer.
Lü Chuanzan, 85, Chinese politician, Chairman of Hebei Provincial People's Congress (1993–1998).
Ivan Mauger, 78, New Zealand motorcycle speedway rider, world champion (1968, 1969, 1970, 1972, 1977, 1979).
Matthew Mellon, 54, American billionaire investor, heart attack.
Napsiah Omar, 74, Malaysian politician, liver cancer.
Alejandro Rojas Wainer, 73, Chilean politician and academic, President of University of Chile Student Federation (1970–1973) and deputy (1973).
Sax Man, 65, American street saxophonist.
Paul Singer, 86, Austrian-born Brazilian economist, co-founder of Partido dos Trabalhadores.
Lynn A. Stout, 60, American legal scholar, cancer.
Rein Tölp, 76, Estonian Olympic middle-distance runner (1964).
Martin J. Whitman, 93, American investment advisor.

17
John Amirante, 83, American anthem singer (New York Rangers).
Rosemary Bamforth, 93, British pathologist and code breaker.
Big Tom, 81, Irish country music singer.
Barbara Bush, 92, American political matriarch, First Lady (1989–1993) and Second Lady (1981–1989), complications from COPD and heart failure.
Joan Chase, 81, American novelist.
Gérard Desanghere, 70, Belgian footballer (R.S.C. Anderlecht, R.W.D. Molenbeek).
Ken Dolan, 75, American journalist and broadcaster, cancer.
Dick Fichtner, 78, American college basketball coach (Occidental Tigers, Pacific Tigers).
David Edward Foley, 88, American Roman Catholic prelate, Bishop of Birmingham (1994–2005), bone cancer.
Peter Guidi, 68, Italian jazz saxophonist and flutist, Creutzfeldt–Jakob disease.
Marcia Hafif, 88, American artist.
Carl Kasell, 84, American radio journalist (Morning Edition) and quiz show judge (Wait Wait... Don't Tell Me!), complications from Alzheimer's disease.
Amoroso Katamsi, 79, Indonesian actor (Pengkhianatan G30S/PKI).
Nils Malmer, 89, Swedish ecologist.
Richard Oldenburg, 84, Swedish museum curator, Director of the Museum of Modern Art (1972–1995).
Vel Phillips, 94, American attorney and politician, Secretary of State of Wisconsin (1979–1983).
Philibert Randriambololona, 90, Malagasy Roman Catholic prelate, Bishop of Antsirabe (1989–1992) and Archbishop of Fianarantsoa (1992–2002).
Karl Rawer, 104, German physicist.
Judith Révész, 102, Hungarian-Dutch potter and sculptor.
Randy Scruggs, 64, American music producer, songwriter ("Angel in Disguise", "Love Has No Right", "We Danced Anyway") and guitarist, multiple Grammy winner.
T. V. R. Shenoy, 76, Indian journalist (Malayala Manorama).
Maurice Sion, 90, Yugoslav-born American-Canadian mathematician.

18
Karl Wolfgang Boer, 92, German-born American physicist.
Robert F. Chapman, 91, American judge.
Kevin Colson, 80, Australian actor.
Jean Flori, 82, French medieval historian.
Grigory Gamarnik, 88, Soviet-born Ukrainian Olympic wrestler (1960).
Jerry Green, 79, American politician, member of the New Jersey General Assembly (since 1992).
John Hope, 47, American baseball player (Pittsburgh Pirates).
Paul Jones, 75, American professional wrestler and manager (JCP, PNW, CWF).
Joan Konner, 87, American academic and journalist, Dean of the Columbia School of Journalism, leukemia.
Luisa Pastor Lillo, 69, Spanish politician, President of Province of Alicante (2011–2015) and Mayor of Sant Vicent del Raspeig (2001–2015), cancer.
Howard Sachar, 90, American historian.
Bruno Sammartino, 82, Italian-American Hall of Fame professional wrestler (WWWF), longest-reigning Heavyweight Champion (1963–1971, 1973–1977), multiple organ failure.
Joël Santoni, 74, French film director (Scrambled Eggs) and screenwriter.
Willibald Sauerländer, 94, German art historian.
Henk Schouten, 86, Dutch footballer (Feyenoord, national team).
James Whelan, 81, American politician, member of the Pennsylvania House of Representatives (1974–1976).
Jeanne Wilson, 92, American Olympic swimmer (1948).
Dale Winton, 62, English radio DJ and television presenter (Dale's Supermarket Sweep, Hole in the Wall, The National Lottery: In It to Win It).

19
Graciela Agudelo, 72, Mexican pianist and composer.
Allan Campbell, 88, American microbiologist.
Evžen Čermák, 85, Czech Olympic alpine skier.
Dharam Pal Choudhary, 66, Indian politician, liver disease.
Stuart Colman, 73, English musician, record producer and broadcaster, cancer.
John Duffie, 72, American baseball player (Los Angeles Dodgers).
Darrell Eastlake, 75, Australian television presenter and sports commentator (Nine Network), Alzheimer's disease and emphysema.
Arnold Eidslott, 91, Norwegian poet.
Joseph Hoover, 85, American actor (The Man Who Shot Liberty Valance, Hell Is for Heroes, Stagecoach).
Cornelius Jakobs, 93, Estonian Russian Orthodox hierarch, Metropolitan Bishop of Tallinn and all Estonia (since 1992).
Zacharias Jimenez, 70, Filipino Roman Catholic prelate, Bishop of Pagadian (1994–2003) and Auxiliary Bishop of Butuan (2003–2009).
Soso Lorho, 79, Indian politician.
Vladimir Lyakhov, 76, Ukrainian-born Russian cosmonaut (Soyuz 32, Soyuz T-9, Soyuz TM-6).
Pepe Mediavilla, 77, Spanish voice actor.
Luis Montes Mieza, 68–69, Spanish anesthetist and pro-euthanasia activist, heart attack.
Walter Moody, 83, American convicted murderer, execution by lethal injection.
Herbert Pilch, 91, German linguist and celtologist.
Saleh Ali al-Sammad, 39, Yemeni politician, President of the Houthi Supreme Political Council (since 2016), air strike.
Gil Santos, 80, American sportscaster (New England Patriots, WBZ).
Agnès-Marie Valois, 103, French nun and World War II nurse.
Abraham Viruthakulangara, 74, Indian Roman Catholic prelate, Bishop of Khandwa (1977–1998) and Archbishop of Nagpur (since 1998).

20
George Alusik, 83, American baseball player (Kansas City Athletics, Detroit Tigers).
Avicii, 28, Swedish electronic musician, DJ and record producer ("Wake Me Up", "Hey Brother", "Levels"), suicide by exsanguination.
Roy Bentley, 93, English footballer (Chelsea, Fulham, national team).
Eddie Blackburn, 61, English footballer (Hull City, Hartlepool United, York City).
Earle Bruce, 87, American football coach (Ohio State), Alzheimer's disease.
Leopoldo Cantancio, 54, Filipino Olympic boxer (1984, 1988), Asian Games silver (1986) and bronze medalist (1990), traffic collision.
Khurshid Drabu, 72, Indian-born English judge and Muslim community leader.
Pedro Erquicia, 75, Spanish journalist.
Bob Gale, 84, English cricketer (Middlesex).
Anne Gibson, Baroness Gibson of Market Rasen, 77, British trade unionist and life peer.
Grace Jelagat Kipchoim, 56, Kenyan politician, member of the National Assembly (since 2013), cancer.
James Ajongo Mawut, 57, South Sudanese army commander.
Nie Bichu, 90, Chinese politician, mayor of Tianjin (1993–1998).
John Petercuskie, 93, American football coach (Dartmouth College, Princeton).
Rajinder Sachar, 94, Indian judge.
James F. Sirmons, 100, American broadcasting executive (CBS).
John Stride, 81, British actor (The Main Chance, The Omen, A Bridge Too Far).
Pavel Šrut, 78, Czech poet, writer and translator.
Al Swift, 82, American broadcaster and politician, member of the U.S. House of Representatives from Washington's 2nd district (1979–1995), idiopathic pulmonary fibrosis.
Shane Yarran, 28, Australian footballer (Fremantle, Subiaco), suicide.
Charles Zwick, 91, American civil servant, Director of the Bureau of the Budget (1968–1969).

21
Fadi Mohammad al-Batsh, 35, Palestinian engineer and academic, shot.
Anwara Begum, 83, Bangladeshi academic and First Lady (2002–2009).
Zoran Bojović, 81–82, Serbian architect.
Robert M. Blakeman, 92, American politician, member of the New York State Assembly (1961–1966).
Pierre Ceyrac, 71, French politician, MEP (1989–1994).
Nina Doroshina, 83, Russian actress (Love and Pigeons).
William F. Dowd, 74, American politician, member of the New Jersey General Assembly.
Dee Hardison, 61, American football player (Buffalo Bills, New York Giants, San Diego Chargers).
Robert Kates, 89, American geographer.
Firmin Le Bourhis, 67, French author, heart attack.
Jim Miceli, 83, American politician, member of the Massachusetts House of Representatives (since 1977), heart attack.
Les Pearce, 94, Welsh rugby league player and coach (Halifax).
Desmond Saunders, 91, British film and television director.
Nelson Pereira dos Santos, 89, Brazilian filmmaker (Vidas Secas, How Tasty Was My Little Frenchman), liver cancer.
Nabi Tajima, 117, Japanese supercentenarian, world's oldest living person and last living verified person born in the 19th century.
Huguette Tourangeau, 79, Canadian operatic mezzo-soprano.
Verne Troyer, 49, American actor (Austin Powers, The Imaginarium of Doctor Parnassus, Harry Potter and the Philosopher's Stone), suicide by alcohol poisoning.
Paul Younger, 55, British hydrogeologist and environmental engineer.

22
Wakil Hussain Allahdad, 32, Afghan wrestler, bombing.
Keith Ashfield, 66, Canadian politician, MP (2008–2015) and MLA (1999–2008).
Demeter Bitenc, 95, Slovenian actor (Outsider).
Wiam Dahmani, 34, Moroccan singer and actress, heart attack.
Per K. Enge, 64, Norwegian-born American engineer.
Roy Haggerty, 58, English rugby league player (St Helens, Barrow).
Ken Hofmann, 95, American businessman and sports team owner (Oakland Athletics).
Richard Jenrette, 89, American investor (Donaldson, Lufkin & Jenrette), cancer.
Gary Jordan, 76, English rugby league footballer.
Nino Khurtsidze, 42, Georgian Grandmaster chess player, International Master (1999), cancer.
Dave Nelson, 73, American baseball player (Texas Rangers, Cleveland Indians) and broadcaster (Milwaukee Brewers), liver cancer.
Ivan Neumyvakin, 89, Russian physician.
Balantrapu Rajanikanta Rao, 98, Indian writer, composer and musicologist.
Charlie Rice, 98, American jazz drummer.
Kona Schwenke, 25, American football player (Notre Dame Fighting Irish).
Hoyt Patrick Taylor Jr., 94, American politician, Lieutenant Governor of North Carolina (1969–1973).

23
Liri Belishova, 91, Albanian politician and resistance member during World War II.
Don Bustany, 89, American radio and television broadcaster (American Top 40).
Bennie Cunningham, 63, American football player (Pittsburgh Steelers), cancer.
Haddon Donald, 101, New Zealand Army lieutenant colonel and politician, MP for Wairarapa (1963–1969).
Bob Dorough, 94, American pianist, singer and composer (Schoolhouse Rock!).
Lyall Hanson, 88, Canadian politician.
Isamu Imoto, 92, Japanese politician, Governor of Saga Prefecture (1991–2003).
Sachio Kinugasa, 71, Japanese baseball player, colon cancer.
Gennady Leonov, 71, Russian mathematician and mechanic.
Béla Magyari, 68, Hungarian air force colonel (Hungarian Astronautical Society).
Patrick James McGlinchey, 89, Irish Roman Catholic missionary, myocardial infarction and kidney failure.
Jerrold Meinwald, 91, American chemist.
Alice Provensen, 99, American children's illustrator and writer.
Arthur B. Rubinstein, 80, American composer (WarGames, Stakeout, Lost in America), cancer.
Bob Schermerhorn, 75, American college basketball coach (Riverside City Tigers, Southern Utah Thunderbirds, Arizona State Sun Devils).
Art Simmons, 92, American jazz pianist, stomach cancer.
Doreen Simmons, 85, British sumo wrestling commentator.
Arthur R.G. Solmssen, 89, American novelist.
Edward W. Tayler, 87, American literary scholar.
Henk Temming, 94, Dutch footballer (VV DOS).
Vladimír Weiss, 78, Slovak footballer (Inter Bratislava), Olympic silver medalist (1964).
Barrie Williams, 79, British football coach and manager (Sutton United).
Leland B. Yeager, 93, American economist.

24
Belal Chowdhury, 79, Bangladeshi poet.
Angelos Delivorrias, 80, Greek art historian and academic (University of Athens), Director of Benaki Museum (1973–2015) and member of the Academy of Athens (since 2016).
Rick Dickinson, 61, British industrial designer, cancer.
Arthur Eustace, 92, New Zealand sprinter, British Empire Games bronze medalist (1950), and sports administrator.
Victor Garaigordóbil Berrizbeitia, 102, Spanish Roman Catholic prelate, Bishop of Los Rios (1963–1982).
Dinu C. Giurescu, 91, Romanian historian.
Paul Gray, 54, Australian musician (Wa Wa Nee), myeloma.
Christine Jewitt, 91, Canadian baseball player (AAGPBL).
Ilja Matouš, 87, Czech Olympic cross-country skier (1956).
Henri Michel, 70, French football player (Nantes) and coach (national team).
Hariton Pushwagner, 77, Norwegian artist.
Marv Rackley, 96, American baseball player (Brooklyn Dodgers).
Quentin Sickels, 91, American football player (Michigan Wolverines).
Leszek Skorupa, 66, Polish Olympic weightlifter.
Emma Smith, 94, English author (Maidens' Trip).
André Tarallo, 92, French businessman (Elf Aquitaine).
Susan Williams, 66, American marine biologist, traffic collision.

25
Abbas, 74, Iranian photographer.
Shuhrat Abbosov, 87, Uzbek actor, film director (Mahallada duv-duv gap), screenwriter (The Mischievous Boy) and film producer.
Adebayo Adedeji, 87, Nigerian politician and diplomat.
Laura Aguilar, 58, American photographer, complications from diabetes.
Michael Anderson, 98, British film director (The Dam Busters, Around the World in 80 Days, Logan's Run), heart disease.
Rolla Anderson, 97, American football and basketball player and coach.
Dick Bate, 71, English football player and manager (Southend United).
Bill Brown, 92, American track athlete, Pan-American champion (1951).
Margo Buchanan-Oliver, New Zealand academic.
Paul N. Carlin, 86, American businessman, Postmaster General (1985–1986), bronchitis and pneumonia.
Gregorio Casal, 82, Mexican actor (La Choca).
Jacquelyn Crowell, 30, American racing cyclist, brain cancer.
David Edwards, 89, British Anglican priest, Chaplain to the Speaker of the House of Commons (1972–1978), Dean of Norwich (1978–1983), Provost of Southwark (1983–1994).
Madeeha Gauhar, 61, Pakistani actress (Burqavaganza) and founder of Ajoka Theatre, cancer.
Yeshayahu Hadari, 84, Israeli rabbi, first rosh yeshiva of Yeshivat HaKotel.
Bjørn Hansen, 79, Norwegian football coach (Rosenborg BK).
Inuka, 27, Singaporean polar bear, first born in the tropics, euthanized by anaesthesia.
Kato Khandwala, 47, American record producer (My Chemical Romance, Breaking Benjamin, Papa Roach), injuries sustained in traffic collision.
Hans-Reinhard Koch, 88, German Roman Catholic prelate, Auxiliary Bishop of Erfurt (1985–2004).
Jerry L. Larson, 81, American judge, Justice of the Iowa Supreme Court (1978–2008).
Edith MacArthur, 92, Scottish actress (Take the High Road).
Steven Marcus, 89, American literary critic and scholar.
Alberto Marson, 93, Brazilian basketball player, Olympic bronze medalist (1948).
Cveto Pretnar, 61, Slovenian Olympic ice hockey player (1984).
Bill Stokes, 89, American college basketball coach (Middle Tennessee Blue Raiders).
M. S. Rajeswari, 86, Indian playback singer.
Anam Vivekananda Reddy, 67, Indian politician, MLA for Nellore Rural (1999–2009), prostate cancer.
Donald Seldin, 97, American nephrologist.

26
Jean Duprat, 81, French politician, member of the National Assembly (1981–1986).
A. Theodore Eastman, 89, American Episcopal prelate, Bishop of Maryland (1986–1994), Parkinson's disease.
Betty Hall, 97, American politician, four-time member of the New Hampshire House of Representatives.
Philip H. Hoff, 93, American politician, Governor of Vermont (1963–1969).
Yoshinobu Ishii, 79, Japanese football player and manager.
Shamsul Islam, 86, Bangladeshi politician, Minister of Information (1991–1996, 2001–2006).
Félix Mata, 67, Venezuelan Olympic sprinter.
Sean McPherson, 47, American politician, member of the South Dakota House of Representatives (since 2017), cancer.
David Mitchell, 77, New Zealand architect.
Charles Neville, 79, American saxophonist (The Neville Brothers), Grammy winner (1990), pancreatic cancer.
Jordan Nikolić, 84, Serbian folk singer.
Henk Numan, 62, Dutch judoka, Olympic bronze medallist (1980). 
Elvira Orphée, 95, Argentine writer, Guggenheim Fellow (1988).
Gianfranco Parolini, 93, Italian film director (Francis the Smuggler, Kiss Kiss, Kill Kill, If You Meet Sartana Pray for Your Death).
Pierre Plateau, 94, French Roman Catholic prelate, Archbishop of Bourges (1984–2000).
Donald Whitton, 94, Canadian concert cellist and teacher.
Wolfgang Zapf, 81, German sociologist.

27
Álvaro Arzú, 72, Guatemalan politician, President (1996–2000), Mayor of Guatemala City (1986–1990, since 2004), heart attack.
Yukiji Asaoka, 80, Japanese actress, Alzheimer's disease.
Earl Balfour, 85, Canadian ice hockey player (Chicago Blackhawks, Toronto Maple Leafs), cancer.
Livio Besso Cordero, 70, Italian politician, Senator (1996–2001).
Donald Keats, 88, American composer.
Maya Kuliyeva, 97, Turkmen operatic soprano and actress.
Michael Luscombe, 64, Australian chief executive (Woolworths Limited), Creutzfeldt–Jakob disease.
George Mulhall, 81, Scottish football player (Aberdeen, Sunderland, national team) and manager.
Kristin Nelson, 72, American actress, painter and author, heart attack.
Juan Carlos Olivas, 34, Mexican actor (El Chapo), cancer.
Paul Junger Witt, 77, American film and television producer (Dead Poets Society, The Golden Girls, Soap), cancer.
Bernard Woma, 51, Ghanaian gyile player.
Roy Young, 83, British singer and pianist.

28
Roberto Angleró, 88, Puerto Rican music composer and singer.
James H. Cone, 79, American Methodist theologian (Black theology).
Larry Harvey, 70, American artist, philanthropist and activist, founder of the Burning Man festival, complications from a stroke.
James Hylton, 83, American stock car racing driver (NASCAR, ARCA) and race team owner (James Hylton Motorsports), traffic collision.
Akhumzi Jezile, 29, South African television presenter and actor, traffic collision.
Eric Koch, 98, German-born Canadian author, broadcaster and academic.
Gerson Leiber, 96, American painter, heart attack.
Judith Leiber, 97, Hungarian-born American fashion designer and businesswoman, Holocaust survivor.
Ramón López Carrozas, 80, Spanish-born Brazilian Roman Catholic prelate, Auxiliary Bishop (1979–1989) and Bishop of Bom Jesus do Gurguéia (1989–2014).
Tetsuro Miura, 62, Japanese football player and manager, lung cancer.
Art Paul, 93, American graphic designer (Playboy), pneumonia.
Montse Pérez, 61, Spanish actress (Plats Bruts).
Carlos del Pozo, 75, Cuban Olympic basketball player (1968).
Russell Renfrey, 94, Australian football player.
Agildo Ribeiro, 86, Brazilian actor.
Art Shay, 96, American photographer (Sports Illustrated, Life) and writer, heart failure.
Yevgeny Titarenko, 82, Russian writer.
Karl Toft, 81, Canadian sex offender, lung cancer.
Bruce Tulloh, 82, British athlete, European champion (1962), cancer.

29
Richard L. Collins, 84, American aviation journalist.
Ewa Dyakowska-Berbeka, 61, Polish painter and graphic and stage designer.
Luis García Meza, 88, Bolivian general and politician, President (1980–1981), heart attack.
Derek Keys, 86, South African executive (ASEA, Sandvik, Sappi) and politician, Minister of Finance (1992–1994).
Rose Laurens, 65, French singer-songwriter ("I Dreamed a Dream", "Africa").
Robert Mandan, 86, American actor (Soap, The Best Little Whorehouse in Texas, Three's a Crowd).
Michael Martin, Baron Martin of Springburn, 72, British politician, MP (1979–2009) and Speaker of the House of Commons (2000–2009).
Andrzej Orłoś, 84, Polish Olympic equestrian (1960).
Lester James Peries, 99, Sri Lankan film producer, director, and screenwriter.
Jan Salter, 82, British artist and animal sanctuary keeper.
Reginald C. Stuart, 74, Canadian historian.
Edward Szmidt, 86, Polish Olympic sprinter (1956).
Aaron Traywick, 28, American life extension activist, drowned.

30
Tim Calvert, 52, American rock guitarist (Nevermore, Forbidden), amyotrophic lateral sclerosis.
Jan Cameron, 71, Australian swimmer and coach, Olympic silver (1964) and Commonwealth Games triple medalist (1966).
Geneviève Claisse, 82, French abstract painter.
Manfredo do Carmo, 89, Brazilian mathematician (differential geometry).
Elisa Izaurralde, 58, Uruguayan biochemist.
Anatole Katok, 73, Russian-born American mathematician.
Joel Kovel, 81, American environmentalist and anti-war activist.
Idris Hasan Latif, 94, Indian military officer, Chief of Air Staff (1978–1981).
Terry Mackenroth, 68, Australian politician, Deputy Premier of Queensland (2000–2005), lung cancer.
Shah Marai, 40, Afghan photojournalist (Agence France-Presse), bombing.
Jhoon Goo Rhee, 86, South Korean taekwondo practitioner.
Gajendra Narayan Singh, Indian musicologist.
Naresh Sohal, 78, Indian composer.
Ralph Stephan, 89, American Olympic rower (1948).
Sir John Treacher, 93, British Royal Navy Admiral, Commander-in-Chief Fleet (1975–1977).
David Wiegand, 70, American journalist (San Francisco Chronicle).

References

2018-04
 04